Markel Alberdi Sarobe (born 22 October 1991) is a Spanish swimmer. He competed in the men's 4 × 100 metre freestyle relay event at the 2016 Summer Olympics.

References

External links
 

1991 births
Living people
Olympic swimmers of Spain
Swimmers at the 2016 Summer Olympics
Spanish male freestyle swimmers